, also known by his Chinese style name , was a bureaucrat of the Ryukyu Kingdom.

Ishadō had been dispatched as envoys to China and Japan for several times. In 1694, he brought yellow potatoes from Fujian Province, China and planted them around his house. Later, he spread them to people. The yellow potatoes propagated around the country and soon became the main food of common people.

Ishadō served as a member of Sanshikan from 1712 to 1721.

References

1659 births
1721 deaths
Ueekata
Sanshikan
People of the Ryukyu Kingdom
Ryukyuan people
17th-century Ryukyuan people
18th-century Ryukyuan people